Cha-42 or No. 42 (Japanese: 第四十二號驅潜特務艇) was a  submarine chaser of the Imperial Japanese Navy that served during World War II.

History
She was laid down on 10 July 1942 and launched on 7 June 1943. On 27 August 1943, she was completed, commissioned, and assigned to the Sasebo Defense Force, Sasebo Naval District. On 15 October 1943, she was reassigned to the 31st Guard Unit Unit, Manila. On 20 February 1945, she was reassigned to the 21st Special Base Force, Surabaya, Java.

She was removed from the Navy List on 3 May 1947.

References

1943 ships
Maritime incidents in June 1945
World War II shipwrecks in the Pacific Ocean
Ships sunk by American submarines
No.1-class auxiliary submarine chasers
Auxiliary ships of the Imperial Japanese Navy